Gjermund Eggen (5 June 1941 – 6 May 2019) was a Norwegian cross-country skier who won three gold medals at the 1966 FIS Nordic World Ski Championships. The championships were held in Oslo in conjunction with  the Holmenkollen ski festival, and so Eggen's medals also counted as Holmenkollen victories. He was awarded the Holmenkollen medal in 1968 (shared with King Olav V, Assar Rönnlund, and Bjørn Wirkola). He competed at the 1968 Winter Olympics in the 30 km event, but finished only 34th. Eggen died in Elverum at age 77.

Cross-country skiing results
All results are sourced from the International Ski Federation (FIS).

Olympic Games

World Championships
 3 medals – (3 gold)

Personal life
Eggen was born in Engerdal to farmer and forest worker Per Eggen and Sina Heggeriset. He married Anne Dagmar Andreassen in 1969.

Selected works
 (autobiography)
Engerdalsvalsen (music album 1967)

References

External links

 – click Holmenkollmedaljen for downloadable pdf file 
 – click Vinnere for downloadable pdf file 

1941 births
2019 deaths
People from Engerdal
Holmenkollen medalists
Holmenkollen Ski Festival winners
Norwegian male cross-country skiers
FIS Nordic World Ski Championships medalists in cross-country skiing
Norwegian autobiographers
Olympic cross-country skiers of Norway
Cross-country skiers at the 1968 Winter Olympics